Emilio Taruffi (1633–1696) was an Italian painter of the Baroque period.

He was a fellow-pupil with Carlo Cignani in the studio of Francesco Albani, then a pupil of the former. Active first at 
Bologna, in decorating the public hall, and next at Rome, where he resided three years, sometimes employed at Sant' Andrea della Valle and in private houses.  He also conducted some altar-pieces, and that of San Pier Celestino, at the church of that name, yields to few of the same period. Maria Elena Panzacchi was one of his pupils. He was apparently assassinated.

References

1633 births
1696 deaths
17th-century Italian painters
Italian male painters
Painters from Bologna
Italian Baroque painters